Harry Beautyman (born 1 April 1992) is an English professional footballer who plays as a central midfielder for Sutton United.

Club career

Leyton Orient
Born in Newham, London, Beautyman was a regular in Leyton Orient's youth and reserve teams before being called up to the first team squad to cover for injuries during the 2009–10 season. He was retained in the Orient squad by new manager Russell Slade for the following season, and went on a month's loan to St Albans City on 22 October 2010. He featured in St Albans' 4–0 FA Cup defeat at Luton Town on 23 October, and made his league debut in the 2–1 defeat at Ebbsfleet United on 30 October. He scored his first senior goal in his next game, a 1–1 draw at Chelmsford City on 2 November.

On 30 December 2010, Beautyman signed on loan for Hastings United until the end of the 2010–11 season. He made his debut for the Us in the 2–1 defeat at home to Maidstone United on 8 January 2011, scoring his first goal on 11 January in the 2–1 home defeat to Fleet Town in the Isthmian League Cup.

Sutton United
Beautyman was released by Orient in May 2011, and subsequently joined Sutton United on a short-term deal in August. After impressing at Sutton and scoring on his debut in a 4–1 win at Tonbridge Angels, he signed an 18-month contract in December.

Welling United
At the end of the 2012–13 season, Beautyman left Sutton in order to play at a higher level, and he signed for Welling United in August.

Peterborough United
On 24 November 2014, Beautyman signed on loan with Football League One club Peterborough United, with a view to a permanent move in January 2015. He made his Football League debut as a substitute in the 3–0 home defeat to Bristol City on 28 November. He signed a permanent deal with Peterborough in the January transfer window.

Northampton Town
On 21 July 2016, Beautyman signed for Northampton Town on a two-year deal from Peterborough United for a nominal fee.

Stevenage
In June 2017, Beautyman joined League Two side Stevenage on a free transfer. He scored his first goal for Stevenage in an EFL Trophy tie against Oxford United on 29 August 2017.

Return to Sutton
Beautyman re-joined his former club, National League side Sutton United, on a permanent deal on 4 January 2018. He signed for Sutton for an undisclosed fee and on a -year contract.
He made his first appearance on 6 January 2018 in a 2–0 away victory over Gateshead.

International career
While at Sutton United, Beautyman was selected for the England C team, and made his debut in the 6–1 victory over Bermuda on 4 June 2013. After joining Welling United, he was called up again for a match against an Estonia U23 side at The Shay in Halifax on 18 November 2014. He scored England's second goal in their 4–2 victory.

Career statistics

Honours

Club
Sutton United
 National League: 2020–21
EFL Trophy runner-up: 2021–22

Individual 
National League Team of the Year: 2020–21

References

External links

1992 births
Living people
Footballers from the London Borough of Newham
English footballers
England semi-pro international footballers
Association football midfielders
Leyton Orient F.C. players
St Albans City F.C. players
Hastings United F.C. players
Sutton United F.C. players
Welling United F.C. players
Peterborough United F.C. players
Northampton Town F.C. players
Stevenage F.C. players
National League (English football) players
English Football League players